Newt Virgus Mills (September 27, 1899 – May 15, 1996) was a U.S. Representative in the first half of the 20th century for Louisiana's 5th congressional district, based in Monroe, Louisiana.

Born in Calhoun in western Ouachita Parish, Mills attended public schools and then enrolled at Louisiana Tech University in Ruston, Louisiana State University in Baton Rouge, Northwestern State University, then Louisiana Normal College, in Natchitoches, and Spencer Business College in New Orleans. He also studied law. From 1921 to 1932, Mills taught school in Mer Rouge in Morehouse Parish. He was the Louisiana supervisor of public accounts from 1933 to 1936. He was also engaged in agricultural pursuits, cattle raising, real estate, and oil. In 1936, he served as colonel on the staff of the governor.

Mills was elected as a Democrat to the Seventy-fifty, Seventy-sixth, and Seventy-seventh Congresses from January 3, 1937, to January 3, 1943. He unseated Representative Riley J. Wilson of Catahoula Parish in the 1936 Democratic primary. In 1942, however, he was himself defeated for renomination by Charles E. McKenzie, a native of DeSoto Parish who had relocated to Monroe. In 1950, Mills and Malcolm Lafargue, the former U.S. attorney for the United States District Court for the Western District of Louisiana, based in Shreveport, waged unsuccessful intraparty challenges to U.S. Senator Russell B. Long, son of the legendary Huey Pierce Long, Jr.

Mills resumed his involvement in oil and natural gas, cotton planting, and a building-supply company. He was a resident of Monroe until his death there at the age of ninety-six on May 15, 1996.

References

External links
 

1899 births
1996 deaths
People from Calhoun, Louisiana
Politicians from Monroe, Louisiana
Louisiana State University alumni
Northwestern State University alumni
Louisiana Tech University alumni
Educators from Louisiana
Businesspeople from Louisiana
Democratic Party members of the United States House of Representatives from Louisiana
20th-century American politicians
20th-century American businesspeople